Paulo Cesar Fonseca Nunes (born January 20, 1979), known as Paulo Cesar, is a Brazilian former professional footballer.

Club career
In 2009, Cesar played six games for Novo Hamburgo. He joined Shahrdari Tabriz on loan in 2010.

Sun Pegasus
On 11 January 2013, Cesar joined Hong Kong First Division League club Sun Pegasus from Brazil club Central SC for an undisclosed fee. Data Up to 1/12/2013

References

1979 births
Living people
Association football defenders
Brazilian footballers
Brazilian expatriate footballers
Expatriate footballers in Iran
Shahrdari Tabriz players
Ituano FC players
J. Malucelli Futebol players
Campinense Clube players
Esporte Clube Novo Hamburgo players
Al-Shamal SC players
Avaí FC players
Joinville Esporte Clube players
Stuttgarter Kickers players
Central Sport Club players
Shenyang Dongjin players
Grêmio Foot-Ball Porto Alegrense players
TSW Pegasus FC players
Hong Kong First Division League players
2. Bundesliga players
Brazilian expatriate sportspeople in Hong Kong
Expatriate footballers in Hong Kong